Light a Wish is the second single album by South Korean girl group Lightsum. It consists of three tracks, including the lead single "Vivace". The single album was released by Cube Entertainment on October 13, 2021.

Background and release
On September 24, Cube Entertainment announced that Lightsum would be releasing their second single album titled Light a Wish on October 13. On September 28, the promotional schedule was released. On September 29, the track listing was released with "Vivace" announced as the lead single. The teaser photo was released on September 30 and October 1. On October 6, the teaser video was released. On October 7, the audio teaser was released. Prior to the single album's release, on October 13, 2021, Lightsum held a showcase to introduce the single album. The single album along with music video for "Vivace" was released on the same day.

Composition
The lead single "Vivace" is described as a future bass and house genre song with "harmonious synth and a dreamy and mysterious mood". The second track "You, Jam" is described as a song with "addictive melody that seems to be imprinted in your mind once you hear it" with lyrics about "the curiosity-filled emotions of the other person with Gen Z sensibility". The last track "Popcorn" features "colorful melody line of teen atmosphere" which makes Lightsum's "unique musical concept stand out".

Commercial performance
Light a Wish debuted at position 7 on South Korea's Gaon Album Chart in the chart issue dated October 10–16, 2021.

Track listing

Charts

Release history

References

2021 albums
Korean-language albums
Cube Entertainment albums
Single albums